Marian Wiktor Woyna-Orlewicz (5 October 1913 – 13 January 2011) was a Polish cross-country skier who competed in the 1936 Winter Olympics. He was born in Wadowice and died in Zakopane.

In 1936 he was a member of the Polish cross-country relay team which finished seventh in the 4x10 km relay event.  In the 18 km competition at the same Olympiad he finished 32nd. Before his death, he was the oldest living Polish Olympic competitor.

References

External links
 Profile 

1913 births
2011 deaths
Polish male cross-country skiers
Polish male Nordic combined skiers
Olympic cross-country skiers of Poland
Olympic Nordic combined skiers of Poland
Cross-country skiers at the 1936 Winter Olympics
Nordic combined skiers at the 1936 Winter Olympics
People from Wadowice
Sportspeople from Lesser Poland Voivodeship
Recipients of the Order of Polonia Restituta
20th-century Polish people